Paolo De Curtis, C.R. (died 1629) was a Roman Catholic prelate who served as Bishop of Isernia (1600–1606) and Bishop of Ravello (1591–1600).

Biography
Paolo De Curtis was ordained a priest in the Congregation of Clerics Regular of the Divine Providence.
On 26 April 1591, he was appointed during the papacy of Pope Gregory XIV as Bishop of Ravello.
On 15 March 1600, he was appointed during the papacy of Pope Clement VIII as Bishop of Isernia.
He served as Bishop of Isernia until his resignation in 1606. He died in 1629 in Rome, Italy.

Episcopal succession
While bishop, he was the principal co-consecrator of:

References

External links and additional sources
 (for Chronology of Bishops) 
 (for Chronology of Bishops)  
 (for Chronology of Bishops) 
 (for Chronology of Bishops)  

Theatine bishops
Bishops appointed by Pope Gregory XIV
Bishops appointed by Pope Clement VIII
1629 deaths
People from Ravello
17th-century Italian Roman Catholic bishops